Geleyns is a Belgian surname. Notable people with the surname include:

 Alfons Geleyns (1887–1914), Belgian private
 Charles Geleyns (1610–1677), Flemish monk

Dutch-language surnames